Coe Glacier is in the U.S. state of Oregon.

Between 1907 and 2004, Coe Glacier lost 15% of its surface area. The glacier terminus retreated  over the same time period.

See also
 List of glaciers in the United States

References

Glaciers of Mount Hood
Glaciers of Hood River County, Oregon
Glaciers of Oregon